Iosefo Sua Liufau (born October 29, 1994) is a former American football quarterback . He played college football at Colorado.

Early years
Liufau attended Bellarmine Preparatory School in Tacoma, Washington. During his career he led the team to a 34-5 record, while completing 522 of 838 passes for 7,297 yards and 68 touchdowns. He committed to the University of Colorado Boulder to play college football.

College career
During his career as a Colorado Buffalo, Liufau played in 41 games and made a school record 39 starts. He also set 98 other school records including career passing touchdowns (60) and passing yards (9,763). As a senior, he was named the Polynesian College Football Player of the Year.

Professional career
After going undrafted in the 2017 NFL Draft, Liufau signed with the Tampa Bay Buccaneers as an undrafted free agent on May 1, 2017. He was waived by the Buccaneers on September 2, 2017. He announced his retirement on January 6, 2018. He now coaches at his former high-school Bellarmine Prep, he serves as the offensive coordinator.

References

External links
Colorado Buffaloes bio

1994 births
Living people
Players of American football from Tacoma, Washington
American sportspeople of Samoan descent
American football quarterbacks
Colorado Buffaloes football players
Tampa Bay Buccaneers players